= Partido Popular Democrático =

Partido Popular Democrático may refer to:

- Popular Democratic Party (Puerto Rico) (Spanish: Partido Popular Democrático)
- Social Democratic Party (Portugal) (Portuguese: Partido Popular Democrático), between 1974 and 1976
